Montes Caucasus is a rugged range of mountains in the northeastern part of the Moon. It begins at a gap of level surface that joins the Mare Imbrium to the west with the Mare Serenitatis to the east, and extends in an irregular band to the north-northeast to the western side of the prominent crater Eudoxus. The range forms the northwestern boundary of the Mare Serenitatis. It forms a continuation of the Montes Apenninus range to the southwest.

There are several breaks in the range where nearby lunar mare has intruded into the formation, particularly near the southern tip. Embedded within the eastern flank of the range is the crater Calippus. Along the eastern flank to the south of Eudoxus is the remnants of the crater Alexander.

The selenographic coordinates of this range are 38.4° N, 10.0° E, and it has an official diameter of 445 km. However some observers list the length as being up to 550 km. The tallest peaks in this range reach heights of 6 km, undoubtedly providing an expansive view of the surroundings from their tops.

The range was named after the Caucasus Mountains on the Earth by the German selenographer Johann H. Mädler. However none of the peaks in this range has been assigned individual names, at least officially.

See also

 List of mountains on the Moon

References

External links
Montes Caucasus (Lunar Captures)

Caucasus, Montes